Rose de Burford (also Roesia, de Boreford; died 1329) was a 14th-century merchant and business woman in the City of London, England.

Born Rose Romeyn, she was the daughter of Juliana Hautyn and Thomas Romayn (d 1312), a wealthy London wool and spice merchant and alderman of the City of London. She married her father's business partner, John of Burford who was also an alderman. She was actively engaged in her husband's business. Their chief client was the state Wardrobe, an office that supervised expenses in the king's household. When John died around 1322, Rose assumed full management of the business and also acquired extensive properties.  She is known to have owned tenements in London and country estates in Surrey, Kent and Sussex. Her own country residence was at Cherletone in  Kent. She had a son, James, and daughter Katherine.

She ran an embroidery business and at the direction of Edward II  executed a cope of "opus anglicum" decorated in coral for which she received 100 marks. At the request of Isabella of France, Queen of England this vestment was sent to the Pope as a gift.

She paid for the erection of a chapel on the south side of the church of St Thomas the Apostle in Cullum Street in the City of London.

Notes

References

External links
Rose de Burford at UK National Archives, Kew. Item details C 135/16/10 Accessed January 2010
Mention of Roesia de Boreford in a letter of 3 Sept 1323 from the Mayor of London to the Mayor of Dover Calendar of Plea and Menoranda Rolls, Cambridge University Press Archive. Accessed January 2010.

Year of birth missing
1329 deaths
British embroiderers
14th-century English businesspeople
English women in business
Merchants from London
Medieval businesswomen